Fleener is a surname. Notable people with the surname include:

Coby Fleener (born 1988), American football player
Mary Fleener (born 1951), American alternative comics artist, writer and musician
Thomas Fleener, American military officer and Guantanamo detainee defense lawyer